Nicolás Ortiz del Puerto y Colmenares Salgado (1620 – 13 August 1681) was a Roman Catholic prelate who served as Bishop of Antequera (1678–1681).

Biography
Nicolás Ortiz del Puerto y Colmenares Salgado was born in Santa Catalina Minas.
On 3 October 1678, he was appointed during the papacy of Pope Alexander VIII as Bishop of Antequera.
On 14 January 1680, he was consecrated bishop by Manuel Fernández de Santa Cruz y Sahagún, Bishop of Tlaxcala. 
He served as Bishop of Antequera' until his death on 13 August 1681.

References

External links and additional sources
 (for Chronology of Bishops) 
 (for Chronology of Bishops) 

17th-century Roman Catholic bishops in Mexico
Bishops appointed by Pope Alexander VIII
1620 births
1681 deaths